Eumetopiella is a genus of picture-winged flies in the family Ulidiidae.

Species
 Eumetopiella engeli
 Eumetopiella fascipennis
 Eumetopiella rufipes
 Eumetopiella varipes

References

Ulidiidae
Tephritoidea genera